Vico Merklein (born 12 August 1977) is a paracyclist who medaled in Cycling at the 2012 Summer Paralympics and the 2016 Summer Paralympics. He is set to represent Germany at the 2020 Summer Paralympics as well.

References

External links
 
 

1977 births
Living people
German male cyclists
Paralympic cyclists of Germany
Paralympic medalists in cycling
Paralympic gold medalists for Germany
Paralympic silver medalists for Germany
Paralympic bronze medalists for Germany
Cyclists at the 2012 Summer Paralympics
Cyclists at the 2016 Summer Paralympics
Cyclists at the 2020 Summer Paralympics
Medalists at the 2012 Summer Paralympics
Medalists at the 2016 Summer Paralympics
Cyclists from Berlin